Ron Arad,  (born ) is a British-Israeli industrial designer, artist, and architectural designer.

Biography

Born in Tel Aviv, Israel, to a Jewish family. He studied at the Bezalel Academy of Arts and Design in Jerusalem between 1971–73, and at the Architectural Association School of Architecture in London from 1974-79. Ron Arad co-founded the design and production studio One Off in 1981 with Caroline Thorman. Ron Arad Associates  architecture and design practice was formed in 1989 and in 2008 Ron Arad Architects was established alongside Ron Arad Associates, with Caroline Thorman and Asa Bruno. His brother is the violist and educator Atar Arad.

Career 

Arad's career as a designer began with the Rover chair, a leather seat from a Rover P6 on a steel frame.{

Ron Arad’s subsequent and tireless experimentation with the possibilities of materials and technology, and his radical re-conception of the form and structure of objects large and small has put him at the forefront of contemporary design and architecture.

Ron Arad was awarded the Royal Designer for Industry (RDI) in 2002, in recognition of his ‘sustained excellence in aesthetic and efficient design for industry’, and was awarded the London Design Medal in 2011. He was professor of Design at the Hochschule in Vienna from 1994 to 1997, and later Professor of Design Products at the Royal College of Art in London up until 2009, when he was made Professor Emeritus. In 2013 he was elected as a Royal Academician by the Royal Academy of Art in London.

Ron Arad has won numerous additional international awards, holds an Honorary Doctorate at Tel Aviv University, and is regularly and widely published. His work features in dozens of prestigious public collections and has been widely exhibited in record-setting shows, including at the MoMA (NYC), the V&A (London) and the Centre Georges Pompidou (Paris).

Ron Arad has designed for all major international furniture and design brands, including ZEUS, Vitra, Kartell, Moroso, Alessi, Driade, Cappellini, Cassina, WMF, Swarovski, Roca and Magis. He has collaborated with a variety of fashion, technology and luxury brands, including Adidas, Nestle, Fiat, Samsung, LG, Bombay Sapphire, Hennessy, Ruinart, Kenzo, and Le Coq Sportif, to name a few.
His public art works have adorned public spaces in London, Tokyo, Seoul, Milan, Toronto, Tel Aviv and Singapore.

Under his direction the architectural side of the practice has completed award winning projects such as the Maserati Showroom in Modena, Italy (2002), Yohji Yamamoto Flagship Store in Tokyo (2003), the Design Museum Holon in Israel (2010) and the Mediacite retail centre in Liège, Belgium. The practice is currently overseeing the construction of a 160,000 m² office development in Tel Aviv, and a new Cancer Hospital in the north of Israel due to be completed in 2021. Ron Arad Architects have also designed the UK Holocaust Memorial, as part of the team responsible for the prestigious, recently-won UK National Holocaust Memorial and Learning Centre project, due for completion in 2022.

Ron Arad was Head of Design Products Department at the Royal College of Art from 1997 to 2009.  Arad designed in 1994 the Bookworm bookshelf, which is still in production by the Italian company Kartell.

In 2005, Arad designed chandeliers for the Swarovski crystal company which if one has the number, can display text messages that are sent to it by incorporating light-emitting diodes (LEDs) operated by SMS text messages. He also has had tables that climb walls instead of being centered in the room. Arad's works are often worked into distinctive biomorphic shapes and are created from his medium of choice, steel. He made plans to expand his studio in 2008.

In 2008–09, Arad paired with KENZO to create his first perfume bottle.  The bottle was on display in his exhibit No Discipline.

He has also designed the Design Museum Holon together with Asa Bruno, which was opened in Israel in 2010.

In 2010, Arad started his collaboration with New Eye London to design an eyewear collection.

Arad's installation “720 Degrees” opened at the sculpture garden of the Israel Museum in August 2012. It consists of 5,600 silicone cords that form a circle 26 feet above the garden. Visitors view projected images standing inside or outside the structure.

Arad designed the ToHA office complex in Tel Aviv, the first phase of which was completed in early 2019. The second phase which is currently in development will, once completed, be among the tallest skyscrapers in Israel.

In 2017, Arad won the competition to design the UK Holocaust Memorial as Memorial Architects, and part of a team led by Ghanaian British architect David Adjaye with Gustafson, Porter + Bowman landscape architects.

See also
 Visual arts in Israel

References

External links

 Ron Arad Associates
 Ron Arad Architects

1951 births
Academics of the Royal College of Art
Israeli Jews
Living people
People from Tel Aviv
Bezalel Academy of Arts and Design alumni
Royal Academicians
Israeli industrial designers
Product designers
Alumni of the Architectural Association School of Architecture
Israeli contemporary artists
Israeli expatriates in the United Kingdom
Israeli architects
Royal Designers for Industry
Compasso d'Oro Award recipients